Macau Post and Telecommunications is an entity under the Government of Macao responsible for postal services and telecommunications regulation.

The acronym CTT comes from the former name of Portuguese postal administration (meaning "Post, Telegraph and Telephone") during the colonial period of Macao.

Postal history 
The Macao Post was founded on 1, March 1884 (separate from Correio Público—Public Post Office of Portugal), as a separate entity from China Post and a sub-member of the Universal Postal Union.  Prior to the transfer of the exercise of sovereignty from Portugal to China in 1999, Macau postage stamps bore the Portuguese words  (i.e., the 'Portuguese Republic'), but now bear the Portuguese words .

Organization 
The Postal service is headed by a Director with two sub-directors.

Services 
 Postal Services (1884-now)
 Postal Savings (1917-now)
 Operator of Telecommunication Services (1927-1981)
 Regulator of Telecommunication Services and Radio Spectrum Management (1982-2000)
 Radio Broadcasting Services (1933-1973)
 Supervision of the Electric Industries Services (1928-1985)
 eSignTrust - Digital Certificate Services (2006-now)
 Communications Museum (2006-now)
 Secure Electronic Postal Services (SEPS) (2008-now)
 Telecommunications Regulator (2017-now)

Postal Stations 
Postal Stations are referred to as Branches with fifteen spread across Macao:
 Central 
 Rua do Campo 
 Red Market (Almirante Lacerda)  
 Mong Ha 
 Hac Sa Wan (Areia Preta) 
 Cultural Centre 
 Terminal Tradic 
 Loja do Museu 
 Airport 
 Nova Taipa 
 Ocean Garden 
 Carmo (The former Taipa Post Office) 
 Coloane 
 Seac Pai Van
 Fai Chi Kei

Post boxes 
CTT post boxes are red in colour as was the case in Hong Kong before 1997. The boxes bear CTT's name in Portuguese and Chinese.

See also 
 List of companies of Macau

References

External links 
History of Macau Post
 About Macau Post
 eSignTrust
 Communications Museum of Macau
 Macau Postal Savings
 Old CTT website

Government departments and agencies of Macau
Macau
Organizations established in 1884
Companies of Macau
Communications in Macau
Postal history of China